Croton ciliatoglandulifer, known as the bush croton or Mexican croton, is a plant species of the genus Croton.

References

ciliatoglandulifer
Flora of Mexico
Flora of El Salvador
Flora of Guatemala
Flora of Haiti
Flora of the Dominican Republic
Flora of Arizona
Flora of Cuba
Flora of Honduras
Flora of Texas
Flora of the Sonoran Deserts
Plants described in 1797
Flora without expected TNC conservation status